Joseph Hone (25 February 1937 – 15 August 2016) was a British writer of the spy novel. Born in London in 1937 he was "given away" by his parents and taken to Dublin. The story of his unusual start in life is recorded in an autobiography "Wicked Little Joe". His most famous novels featured a British spy called Peter Marlow. The first of the series was The Private Sector (1971), set in the Six-Day War. Marlow's story continues in The Sixth Directorate (1975), The Flowers of the Forest (a.k.a. The Oxford Gambit) (1980), and The Valley of the Fox (1982). During his heyday, in the 1970s, Hone was favourably compared with writers such as Len Deighton, Eric Ambler and John le Carré. Whilst some spy novels, such as those of le Carré are often set mainly inside the offices of the spy department, and attract praise for the depth of their characterization and plotting, others (such as the James Bond series) are set in the field, and provide explosive action. Joseph Hone's stories by contrast, have a foot in both camps, and he became renowned amongst aficionados of the spy genre for both the quality of his writing, and the excitement of his plots. He released his memoir, Wicked Little Joe in 2009.

Background 
Hone was educated at Kilkenny College and St. Columba's College, Dublin. Hone had a varied career including working as an assistant in a second-hand bookshop in London, as a teacher at Drogheda Grammar School in Ireland and with the Egyptian Ministry of Education in Cairo, Heliopolis and Suez. He also worked for a publishing firm, and in radio and television. In 1960 he became co-founder of Envoy Productions, Dublin and co-produced a number of plays and musicals at the Theatre Royal, Stratford, East London. His wide experience in radio and television resulted in an appointment as Radio and Television Officer with the United Nations Secretariat in New York in 1968 and for the next two years he travelled far and wide, making documentary programmes based on trips to Ethiopia, Kenya, Uganda, Tanzania, Malawi, India, Pakistan and the Far East. Out of these experiences came The Dancing Waiters (1975). He produced a number of radio programmes for UN radio, later broadcast by the BBC.

Joseph Hone held a variety of positions in radio and television, including radio and then television critic for The Listener (1971–1980). His background also includes an overseas posting with the British Broadcasting Corporation (BBC). He died on 15 August 2016.

Novels 
In his first novel, The Private Sector (1971), Marlow, a teacher in Cairo finds himself becoming a spy for the British. In part this work was a by-product of Hone's experiences in 1957–58 when he was a teacher in Europe. He stated that he had not been associated with Intelligence work but that he had 'worked with and met such people, especially while I was a teacher in Egypt and in New York with the UN.' Hone's second book, The Sixth Directorate (1975) aroused a lot of attention. This book continues Marlow's story after his release from Durham jail, where he has been sent on a frame-up by his own Department and it deals with his impersonation of an Englishman, a captured KGB agent living in London, his subsequent adventures as a fall-guy agent in the UN in New York and his eventual encounter with the KGB in Cheltenham.

Hone's last novel was Goodbye Again.

Hone's books, including his last novel have been translated into various languages including French.

Hone reviewed books for the New York Times Book Review, The Spectator, The New Statesman, and the Daily Telegraph.

Personal life 
He was a member of the Hone family, and the grandson of Joseph Hone, biographer to W.B. Yeats.

Since 2000, Hone had been teaching creative writing as well as a Core course which looked at the history and culture of various countries, including India and China. He taught at Wroxton College in Oxfordshire; Wroxton College is part of Fairleigh Dickinson University based in New Jersey, USA.

For a story on Joseph's connection to Pamela Travers the creator of Mary Poppins listen to an interview with Joe Duffy on Irish National radio (RTÉ1) which went out live on Monday 2 December 2013. The interview starts about 1/3rd of the way into the program. In particular he tells of his brother, Camillus who was adopted by Pamela. Camillus was one of twin boys living in Kiliney, Dublin when he was adopted. Hone also wrote an article about Camillus and P.L. Travers which appeared in the Times 2 section of the Times newspaper, Friday 29 November 2013.

Hone and Jacky (née Yeend) married in 1964. Jacky survived him when he died at the age of 80 years. The Hones had two children.

Bibliography

Novels 
 The Private Sector [1971]
 The Sixth Directorate [1975]
 The Paris Trap [1977]
 The Flowers of the Forest [1980], published in the U.S. as The Oxford Gambit
 The Valley of the Fox [1982]
 Summer Hill [1990]
 Return to Summer Hill [1990]
 Firesong [1997]
 Goodbye Again [2011]

Non-fiction 
 The Dancing Waiters [1975]
 Gone Tomorrow [1981]
 Children of the Country: Coast to Coast Across Africa [1986]
 Duck Soup in the Black Sea [1988]
 Wicked Little Joe [2009]

References

External links 
 

Spy fiction writers
Irish writers
Irish people of Dutch descent
1937 births
2016 deaths